Mewgenics is an upcoming tactical role-playing roguelike life simulation video game developed by Edmund McMillen and Tyler Glaiel. The game has players breed cats, which assume character classes and are sent out on adventures, featuring tactical combat on a procedurally-generated grid. Originally announced by Team Meat in 2012 as a follow-up to Super Meat Boy, the game experienced a protracted development cycle, before being cancelled and subsequently reacquired by McMillen for development with Glaiel in 2018. Mewgenics is tentatively set to be released via the digital distribution platform Steam in 2024.

Gameplay 
Mewgenics is a tactical role-playing game that is divided into two stages: combat and breeding. At the beginning of the game, the player is assigned a team of four cats, which feature character classes, such as hunter, mage and healer. The cats have varying statistics, as well as access to mana reserves, which influence their roles and performance. The cats may affect the aforementioned statistics by equipping clothing and other paraphernilia. Sent on a journey, the combat portion of the game principally takes place on a procedurally-generated grid with a two-dimensional isometric perspective, where the team must eliminate all the enemies, before advancing. Every character may move and use an active ability, with passive abilities affecting them. The combat is heavily influenced by the environment, with the weather affecting performance and the foliage being able to be manipulated for and against the cats. If a cat loses all its hit points, it will be incapacitated, yet remain in the battle, though it will suffer long-term consequences, such as brain damage – and could still be killed with three subsequent blows from enemies. Should a cat die, its items will be lost, including any exclusive rarities that may only drop once. After a successful battle, the player may choose a cat to level up, thereby enhancing its abilities.

The second stage of the game, breeding, comes into play once the player has completed their run. Surviving cats return to a domestic house setting, carrying with them their statistics, as well as equipment that may be used by other cats. Two cats in the same room may mate, resulting in the breeding of a new cat that inherits their parents' traits. Inherited traits may produce cats that are ideal for further runs. Inbreeding, the act of breeding cats with closely related parents, results in offspring with mutations and other deficiencies. As simulated in-game time passes, cats die from old age.

Development

Original design and cancellation 

Following the release of the critically and commercially successful Super Meat Boy, artist Edmund McMillen and programmer Tommy Refenes of Team Meat began developing Mew-Genics - then with a hyphenated title. Announced in October 2012, the game was described by McMillen as being randomly generated, involving cats and the "strangest project [he had] ever worked on". Drawing inspiration from The Sims, Pokémon, Animal Crossing and the Tamagotchi, Mew-Genics featured turn-based strategy combat, while leaning heavily into house simulation element. Cats could participate in various activities, such as beauty pageants and sewer races – as well as be cryogenically frozen for longevity. The cats would engage bosses in a manner principally styled after Pokémon, with their opponents becoming progressively more difficult with every fight. The game was intended to be a multi-platform title, with iOS being the first announced platform, followed by Steam and Android. The game's soundtrack was composed by the two-member band Ridiculon, McMillen's long-term collaborators.

Shortly after production began, McMillen and Refenes realized that they had underestimated the scope of Mew-Genics, with the game experiencing feature creep. Therefore, Team Meat temporarily shelved Super Meat Boy Forever, their planned handheld successor to Super Meat Boy, to prioritize Mew-Genics. It was originally planned to be released in 2014, with a playable build for attendees at PAX Prime in Seattle, Washington between August and September 2013, but Team Meat announced directly before the event that it would only be exhibited and not playable. The game was playable for the public at PAX East in Boston, Massachusetts, in April 2014, with Team Meat insisting it would still release that year. In August 2014, development of Mew-Genics was put on hold, with Refenes stating that the team would be working on refactoring the gameplay to make it more coherent. After two years of no development, McMillen confirmed in 2016 that Mew-Genics had been cancelled, while his new focus would be on his new project, The Legend of Bum-bo. McMillen subsequently departed from Team Meat – he credited the divergent interests of the co-owners, with Refenes looking to further develop the Meat Boy franchise, while he wanted to pursue new intellectual properties.

Final design and release 

In January 2018, McMillen announced in a blog post that he had secured the rights to Mewgenics from Team Meat and that the project would be developed with Tyler Glaiel, McMillen's collaborator from The End Is Nigh. The game's design would undergo a complete overhaul, with an anticipated release date several years away. While McMillen completed work on The Legend of Bum-bo, the final expansion for The Binding of Isaac: Rebirth called Repentance and the physical card game Tapeworm, Glaiel prototyped several gameplay variants for the rebooted Mewgenics. The genres Glaiel tested included brawler and real-time strategy, though he found them to be too chaotic. In early 2020, a turn-based tactical role-playing prototype moved forward as the game's design.

In October 2022, the official Steam page for Mewgenics was launched, touting it as a turn-based roguelike legacy game, with a tentative release date of 2024. The game was previewed by journalist Russ Frushtick of Polygon on Halloween 2022, detailing his playthrough, as well as McMillen and Glaiel's account of the game's development history.

Notes

References

External links 
  

Biological simulation video games
Roguelike video games
Single-player video games
Tactical role-playing video games
Turn-based strategy video games
Upcoming video games scheduled for 2024
Vaporware video games
Video games about cats
Video games about genetic engineering
Video games designed by Edmund McMillen
Video games designed by Tyler Glaiel
Video games developed in the United States
Video games using procedural generation
Windows games